Ski Ben Eoin is a ski hill located in Ben Eoin, Nova Scotia, Canada, which is approximately 27 km from Sydney. The hill overlooks the East Bay of the Bras d'Or Lakes. The ski hill was founded in 1968.

It features 11 runs, including a terrain park. The longest run is 1300 m.

The hill has a vertical drop of 153 m.

References

External links
Official website
Ski Ben Eoin - Tourism Nova Scotia

Ski areas and resorts in Nova Scotia
Geography of Cape Breton County